Franklin is a small city in and the parish seat of St. Mary Parish, Louisiana, United States. The population was 7,660 at the 2010 census. It is part of the Morgan City Micropolitan Statistical Area and the larger Lafayette-Acadiana combined statistical area.

History
Franklin, named for Benjamin Franklin, was founded in 1808 as the "Carlin's Settlement" by French-born pioneer Joseph Carlin and his family. It became the parish seat in 1811 and the town was incorporated in 1820. Though early settlers included French, Acadian, German, Danish and Irish, the town's culture and architecture is heavily influenced by the unusually large numbers of English that chose to settle there after the Louisiana Purchase in 1803. 

Numerous large sugar plantations arose in the area, and with the development of steam-boating, Franklin became an interior sugar port. With the later advent of the railroad, it became a sawmill town. 

Franklin's First United Methodist Church was established in 1806, making it the first Protestant church established in the state of Louisiana.

Sugar plantations
By the 1830s, Bayou Teche was the main street of Acadiana, with one plantation after another. The area's sugar cane planters were among the South's wealthiest agriculturists. This is reflected in the grand plantation homes and mansions they built in Franklin and the surrounding countryside. Most of these magnificent structures are still standing and well preserved, giving Franklin its unique architectural flavor. 

Franklin's Historic District is listed in the National Register of Historic Places (NRHP) and encompasses over 420 notable structures. Some of the historic plantations in Franklin listed in the NRHP include the Alice C. Plantation House, Arlington Plantation House, and the Dixie Plantation House.

Civil War
During the Civil War, the Battle of Irish Bend, also known as Nerson's Woods, was fought near Franklin on April 14, 1863. Though eventually forced to retreat, the badly outnumbered Confederate forces commanded by General Richard Taylor cost the Union troops, under General Cuvier Grover, significant losses. Four hundred men were killed or wounded in the confrontation, including Confederate Colonel James Reily, a factor in halting the Union drive to invade Texas.

Geography

Louisiana Highways 182, which runs through downtown, and 87, which is located on the outskirts of Franklin, both head north passing through the communities of Baldwin, Jeanerette, and New Iberia, both located in Iberia Parish. Both LA-182 and U.S. Highway 90 both head to northwest to Lafayette, and southeast to Morgan City, .

Climate

Demographics

2020 census

As of the 2020 United States census, there were 6,728 people, 2,743 households, and 1,466 families residing in the city.

2000 census
As of the census of 2000, there were 8,354 people, 3,026 households, and 2,181 families residing in the city. The racial makeup of the city was 47.47% White, 50.00% African American, 0.63% Native American, 0.31% Asian, 0.30% from other races, and 1.28% from two or more races. Hispanic or Latino of any race were 0.79% of the population.

There were 3,026 households, out of which 36.0% had children under the age of 18 living with them, 44.5% were married couples living together, 22.1% had a female householder with no husband present, and 27.9% were non-families. 25.1% of all households were made up of individuals, and 11.5% had someone living alone who was 65 years of age or older. The average household size was 2.72 and the average family size was 3.26.

In the city, the population was spread out, with 30.4% under the age of 18, 8.0% from 18 to 24, 26.4% from 25 to 44, 21.8% from 45 to 64, and 13.4% who were 65 years of age or older. The median age was 35 years, more than a year older than the statewide median age of 34.0 years. For every 100 females, there were 81.7 males. For every 100 females age 18 and over, there were 77.6 males.

The median income for a household in the city was $24,844, and the median income for a family was $30,625. Males had a median income of $32,188 versus $16,935 for females. The per capita income for the city was $12,943. About 24.5% of families and 27.6% of the population were below the poverty line, including 41.6% of those under age 18 and 15.6% of those age 65 or over.

Education
St. Mary Parish School Board operates public schools:

Elementary schools:
 W. P. Foster Elementary School
 LaGrange Elementary School

Secondary schools:
 Franklin Junior High School
 Franklin Senior High School

Not Operated by St. Mary Parish School Board:

Private schools:
 St. John Elementary School
 Hanson Memorial High School

Notable people

Actors 

 Ned Romero, actor
 Jerome Bonaparte "Black Jack" Ward, actor who appeared in over 140 cowboy movies from 1927 to 1946.

Politicians and civil service 

 C. C. Aycock, the only three-term Lieutenant governor in modern Louisiana history; former Speaker of the Louisiana House of Representatives
 Joshua Baker, Governor of Louisiana 1868
Carl W. Bauer, Member of the Louisiana House of Representatives from 1967 to 1972 and of the Louisiana State Senate from 1972 to 1976
 Ralph Norman Bauer, Speaker of the Louisiana House of Representatives from 1940 to 1948; leader of the impeachment forces in 1929 against Governor Huey Pierce Long, Jr.
 Donelson Caffery, Louisiana State Senator, United States Senator, lieutenant in the Confederate Army
 Patrick T. Caffery, Louisiana State Representative and United States Representative grandson of Donelson Caffery
 Murphy J. Foster, Governor of Louisiana from 1892 to 1900, also a U.S. Senator
Murphy J. Foster, Jr., Governor of Louisiana from 1996 to 2004; former member of the Louisiana State Senate
 Henry Johnson, Governor of Louisiana from 1824 to 1828, also District Judge for St. Mary Parish 1811
 Sam S. Jones, state representative for St. Mary Parish since 2008
 Alexander Porter (June 24, 1785 – January 13, 1844) was an attorney, politician, and planter in St. Mary Parish who served as U.S. Senator from 1833 to 1837. He had served a term in the Louisiana House from 1816 to 1818, and on the Louisiana Supreme Court from 1821 to 1833. He built Oaklawn Manor.
Gaston J. Sigur, Jr., Assistant Secretary of State for East Asian and Pacific Affairs under the Reagan Administration

Sports 
Wallace Francis, football player, wide receiver for the Buffalo Bills and the Atlanta Falcons
Ernie Ladd, football player for Grambling University under Eddie Robinson, professional career San Diego Chargers, Houston Oilers and Super Bowl Champion Kansas City Chiefs (1970); professional wrestler known as "The Big Cat"
Leonard Marshall, football player for the New York Giants
Warren Wells, Pro football player for the Detroit Lions and Oakland Raiders
John Porche, athletic trainer for the University of Louisiana at Lafayette, inducted into the UL Athletics Hall of Fame for Administration in 2017

Theatre
Teche Theater (founded 1939 as a cinema and revamped for live theatre in 1993)
 Earl Long in Purgatory (2004) (John "Spud" McConnell)
 Driving Miss Daisy (2005) (Diane Wiltz, Tyra Yarber, and Ed "Tiger" Verdin)
 A Soldier's Play (2006) (Tyra Yarber, Ed "Tiger Verdin and Averis Anderson)
 Fiddler on the Roof (2006) (Larry Deslatte and Allison Jones)
 November (2009) (Ed "Tiger" Verdin and Ricky Pellerin)

Filmography
Movies filmed in Franklin, Louisiana include: 
Easy Rider (1969)
The Drowning Pool (1975)
All the King's Men (2006)

See also 

 National Register of Historic Places listings in St. Mary Parish, Louisiana

References

External links

City of Franklin official website

Cities in Louisiana
Cities in St. Mary Parish, Louisiana
Parish seats in Louisiana
Populated places established in 1808
1808 establishments in the Louisiana Territory